The yellow-breasted barbet (Trachyphonus margaritatus) is a species of bird in the Lybiidae family.
It is found in Burkina Faso, Chad, Djibouti, Eritrea, Ethiopia, Mali, Mauritania, Niger, Nigeria, Somalia, and Sudan.

References

yellow-breasted barbet
Birds of the Sahel
yellow-breasted barbet
Taxonomy articles created by Polbot
yellow-breasted barbet